Crown Hill is a suburb of the North Shore located in Auckland, New Zealand. It is under the local governance of the Auckland Council for local government purposes.

The population was 3,519 in the 2013 census. This was an increase of 249 people since the 2006 Census.

References

Suburbs of Auckland
North Shore, New Zealand